Cláudio Pires Morais Ramos (born 16 November 1991) is a Portuguese professional footballer who plays for FC Porto as a goalkeeper.

He spent most of his career with Tondela, making 267 total appearances over nine seasons. In 2020, he signed with Porto.

Ramos won one cap for Portugal.

Club career

Tondela
Born in Vila Nova de Paiva, Viseu District, Ramos played for Académico de Viseu F.C. in his hometown as a youth before moving to Vitória S.C. in 2007. He never played a senior game for the team from Guimarães and was loaned to Amarante F.C. and C.D. Tondela, who he joined permanently after winning promotion from the third division in the 2011–12 season.

Tondela reached the Primeira Liga for the first time in 2014–15,  and Ramos made his debut in the competition on 30 October 2015 in a 0–4 home loss against S.L. Benfica after Matt Jones suffered an injury at the 30-minute mark. He was voted by club fans as Player of the Year for the 2015–16 campaign.

Ramos played all 34 matches in 2017–18, and the last one was his 200th for Tondela, making him the second-most used player in their history. He also led the league in saves (126) and penalty saves (three) that year.

From 9 April 2017 to 9 February 2020, Ramos started 94 consecutive league games, surpassing the previous record held by fellow goalkeeper Rui Patrício. He extended that mark to 103 on 1 July.

Ramos left Tondela at the end of the 2019–20 season, when his contract expired.

Porto
On 13 August 2020, Ramos signed a four-year deal with defending champions FC Porto. His first involvement for the club was on 21 December as the reserves drew 1–1 at G.D. Estoril Praia.

Ramos earned a league medal for the first team in the 2021–22 campaign, starting in a 2–0 home win over Estoril in the last matchday.

International career
Ramos made his senior debut for Portugal on 14 October 2018 in a 3–1 friendly win over Scotland at Hampden Park, playing the last four minutes as a substitute for Beto.

Career statistics

Club

Honours
Tondela
Segunda Liga: 2014–15

Porto
Primeira Liga: 2021–22
Taça de Portugal: 2021–22
Taça da Liga: 2022–23
Supertaça Cândido de Oliveira: 2022

References

External links

1991 births
Living people
Sportspeople from Viseu District
Portuguese footballers
Association football goalkeepers
Primeira Liga players
Liga Portugal 2 players
Segunda Divisão players
Vitória S.C. players
Amarante F.C. players
C.D. Tondela players
FC Porto B players
FC Porto players
Portugal youth international footballers
Portugal international footballers